Isaluy-e Heydarlu (also Romanized as ‘Īsálūy-e Ḩeydarlū; also known as ‘Īsálū-ye Ḩeydarlū) is a village in Bash Qaleh Rural District, in the Central District of Urmia County, West Azerbaijan Province, Iran. At the 2006 census, its population was 92 with 26 families.

References 

Populated places in Urmia County